Pablo Romero (January 15, 1961) is a retired Cuban amateur boxer best known for winning two light-heavyweight gold medals at World Championships. The dominant light heavyweight boxer of the eighties he never participated in Olympics as his country boycotted both the 1984 and 1988 games. He was a tall boxer-puncher with a strong jab.

Career
At the 1982 World Amateur Boxing Championships he won his first title.

He won the PanAm Games 1983 in Caracas beating Evander Holyfield in the finals.

At the 1986 World Amateur Boxing Championships he once again finished first.

He won the PanAm Games in 1987 in Indianiapolis. At the semis he was outboxed on the inside by future Olympic gold medalist Andrew Maynard but knocked Maynard down who quit with a twisted ankle.

Cuba boycotted the Olympics in 1984 and 1988.

At the 1989 World Amateur Boxing Championships he lost to reigning Olympic middleweight champion Henry Maske, a tall southpaw from East Germany and settled for silver.

External links
(all other results click on the medal table links)
1986 World Championships
1987 PanAmGames
1987 final (YouTube)

Light-heavyweight boxers
Living people
1961 births
Boxers at the 1983 Pan American Games
Boxers at the 1987 Pan American Games
Pan American Games gold medalists for Cuba
Cuban male boxers
AIBA World Boxing Championships medalists
Pan American Games medalists in boxing
Medalists at the 1983 Pan American Games
Medalists at the 1987 Pan American Games
20th-century Cuban people